Engineering Informatics is related to information engineering, and computational engineering. In general, informatics deals with information processing (unlike matter or energy). Compared to technical informatics, engineering informatics focuses more on software. However, it does not rather focus on issues of large-scale systems (like practical informatics). Typically, informatic engineers deal with computer-aided design, machine learning, computer vision, mobile robotics, real-time computing, digital image processing, pattern recognition, digital control, networking or multi-agent systems.  Cognitive informatic background finds particular applications in the issues of artificial intelligence. Engineering informatics is also related to neuroinformatics (e.g. creating brain-computer interfaces).

Computer Engineering as a discipline of field study

Computer-aided design (CAD), intelligent CAD, engineering analysis, collaborative design support, computer-aided engineering, and product life-cycle management are some of the terms that have emerged over the past decades of computing in engineering. Codification and automation of engineering knowledge and methods have had major impact on engineering practice. The use of computers by engineers has consistently tracked advancements in computer and information sciences. Computing, algorithms, computational methods, and engineering have increasingly intertwined themselves as developments in theory and practice in both disciplines influence each other. Therefore, it is now time to begin using the term “engineering informatics” to cover the science of the information that flows through these processes.

Informatics, with origins in the German word "Informatik" referring to automated information processing, has evolved to its current broad definition. The rise of the term informatics can be attributed to the breadth of disciplines that are now accepted and envisioned as contributing to the field of computing and information sciences. A common definition of informatics adopted by many departments/schools of informatics comes from the University of Edinburgh: "the study of the structure, behavior, and interactions of natural and artificial computational systems that store, process and communicate information.” Informatics includes the science of information, the practice of information processing, and the engineering of information systems.

The history of engineering and computers shows a trend of increasing sophistication in the type of engineering problems being solved. Early CAD was primarily geometry driven (using mathematics and computer science). Then came the engineering use of AI, driven by theories of cognitive science and computational models of cognition (logic and pattern based). More recently, models of collaboration and representation and acquisition of collective knowledge have been introduced, driven by fields of social sciences (ethnography, sociology of work) and philosophy.

Information technology and sciences to have both created the need for, and play a role in, facilitating the management of complex sociotechnical processes. Information is context specific and its engineering is an integral part of any exchange among people and machines. Thus, informatics is the process of:
 creating and codifying the linguistic worlds (representational structures) represented by the object worlds in the relevant domain, and
 managing the attendant meanings through their contexts of use and accumulation through synthesis and classification.
Engineering informatics is a reflective task beyond the software/hardware that supports engineering; it is a cross-disciplinary perspective on the nature of collective intellectual work. It thereby becomes critical that a consciousness of the use of languages and their implications in the storage and retrieval of information in a work community be addressed as part of any information engineering task.

The role informatics plays in engineering products and services has become significant in the past decades. Most of the development has happened in an ad hoc manner, as can be expected. Techniques appeared in computer science and in programming practice; these techniques get used in engineering as is. Early computing in engineering was limited due to the capacities of computers. Computational power and telecommunications systems have started to converge, resulting in the possibilities of untethered connections and exchange of information that was just a distant dream in the early computing days. These developments have made the problems of distance less onerous and allow for global design, manufacturing, and supply chains. However, the problem of managing a global supply chain still is a daunting task with numerous incompatibilities in information exchange and coordination.

The problem of integrating entire sets of industries in a flexible and ad hoc manner is still a dream especially for small-scale industries within the larger global environment. For this dream to become a reality, standards become critical. With technology evolving continuously, the task of creating information standards for varieties of exchanges from the syntactic to the semantic is a challenge yet to be resolved.

Computer scientists or engineers by themselves cannot solve engineering informatics problems or the processes required to manage information in the context of engineered systems—it has to be a collaborative effort. The lack of skills among computer scientists in engineering and engineers in computing has led to problems bridging the disciplines. What pedagogical stance can help prepare students to deal with the complexities that are inherent in the task of engineering informatics? The culture of learning has to encourage the appreciation of diversity at the same time looking for the core essence and canonical nature of the experiences. While the products of today are increasingly designed for variety, we still have not mastered this process conceptually, let alone are we preparing our students. The fundamental characteristic of engineering informatics is that it is applicable at local levels of decision making in a design process as well as at the holistic level of product management and organizational design.

Nowadays, people are entering an era of networks where different infrastructural networks can be connected through information networks. The information network can connect the manufacturing network to the design and supply chain network in almost real time using information systems that include sensors and ID tags. One's imagination is the limit in this integrative power of information networks. It is this new complex world that we need to teach students, among other things, the ability to reflect on the information they use and how to handle this information, what it means to use (or not) computational tools, the need to create tools at different scales of inquiry and across disciplines, and how to view one's own discipline from an engineering informatics point of view.

Engineering technology areas

It encompasses engineering technology areas in:
 
 Neural Network Engineering and Intelligent System Application
 Decision Support System and Information Modelling System
 Reverse Software Engineering and Reusable Software Engineering
 The application of Cryptography in Computer Security System
 Enterprise Architectural Framework and Application
 Distributed Engineering and Business Services
 Sensing, Monitoring, Control and Structural Dynamics
 Human and Social Modelling for Design Simulations
 Computational Engineering
 Virtual Office and Optimization
 Networking computing for Engineering
 IT Applications in Engineering 
 Systems and Network Technologies 
 Interactive Media and Internet Development 
 Supply Chain and Logistics Management
 etc.

Universities and institutions offering Engineering Informatics
Engineering Informatics is a field of undergraduate study in some universities and polytechnics:

Argentina
 Universidad Argentina de la Empresa, Buenos Aires, Argentina

Czech Republic
 University of Chemistry and Technology, Prague, Czech Republic
 Tomas Bata University in Zlín, Zlín, Czech Republic

Egypt

Information Technology Institute, Smart Village, 6th of October City, Egypt  (Post-Graduate Diploma for Engineers)

Germany
 Otto-von-Guericke University Magdeburg, Magdeburg, Germany
 Hochschule für Technik und Wirtschaft Berlin, Berlin, Germany
 Technische Universität Ilmenau, Ilmenau, Germany

Georgia
 Georgian Technical University, Tbilisi, Georgia

Guatemala
 Universidad Mesoamericana, Guatemala City, Guatemala

Greece
 University of Western Macedonia, Kozani, Greece
 International Hellenic University, Thessaloniki, Greece
 Technological Educational Institute of Central Macedonia, Serres, Greece
 Technological Educational Institute of West Macedonia, Kastoria, Greece

Hungary
 Budapest University of Technology and Economics, Budapest, Hungary
 Óbuda University, Budapest, Hungary
 University of Pannonia - Faculty of Information Technology, Veszprém, Hungary
 Dennis Gabor College, Budapest, Hungary

Indonesia
Trisakti University, Jakarta, Indonesia
Pancasila University, Jakarta, Indonesia
University of Bunda Mulia, Jakarta, Indonesia
Gunadarma University, Bekasi, Indonesia
University of Amikom Yogyakarta, Indonesia
Duta Wacana Christian University, Yogyakarta, Indonesia
University of Muhammadiyah Malang, Malang, Indonesia
Bandung Institute of Technology, Bandung, Indonesia
Sepuluh Nopember Institute of Technology, Surabaya, Indonesia
State Islamic University Sunan Gunung Djati Bandung, Bandung, Indonesia

Japan
Waseda University, Shinjuku, Tokyo, Japan
University of Tokyo, Bunkyo, Tokyo, Japan

Lithuania
Vilnius Gediminas Technical University, Vilnius, Lithuania

Mexico
 Instituto Politécnico Nacional, -  UPIICSA , Mexico

Portugal 

 University of Madeira, Funchal, Portugal
 University of Minho, Braga, Portugal
 NOVA University Lisbon, Lisbon, Portugal
 ISCTE – University Institute of Lisbon, Lisbon, Portugal
 University of Algarve - Faculty of Sciences and Technology, Algarve, Portugal
 University of Aveiro, Aveiro, Portugal
 University of Beira Interior, Covilhã, Portugal
 University of Coimbra - Faculty of Sciences and Technology, Coimbra, Portugal
 University of Évora - School of Sciences and Technology, Évora, Portugal
 University of Lisbon - Faculty of Sciences, Lisbon, Portugal
 University of Trás-os-Montes and Alto Douro - School of Sciences and Technology, Vila Real, Portugal
 Instituto Politécnico do Porto - Instituto Superior de Engenharia do Porto, Porto, Portugal

Singapore
Nanyang Polytechnic, Ang Mo Kio, Singapore

Taiwan
 Chung Hua University, Hsinchu, Taiwan

United Kingdom
 Newcastle University, Newcastle upon Tyne, North East England, United Kingdom
 University of Cambridge, Cambridge, England, United Kingdom
 Cardiff University, Cardiff, Wales, United Kingdom

United States
 Columbia University, Manhattan, New York City, United States
 Harvard University, Manhattan, Cambridge, Massachusetts, United States
 Massachusetts Institute of Technology, Cambridge, Massachusetts, United States
 Princeton University, New Jersey, United States
 Stanford University, Stanford, California, United States
 University of California, Berkeley, California, United States

Venezuela
Universidad Centroccidental Lisandro Alvarado, Barquisimeto, Venezuela
Andrés Bello Catholic University, Caracas, Venezuela
Alejandro de Humboldt University, Caracas, Venezuela
Universidad de Oriente, Anzoátegui, Venezuela
Universidad Nacional Experimental de Guayana, Ciudad Guayana
Universidad Nacional Experimental del Táchira, San Cristóbal, Venezuela
Universidad Politécnica Territorial de Mérida, Mérida, Venezuela
Universidad Politécnica Territorial del Estado Aragua, Aragua, Venezuela

Publications
 Advanced Engineering Informatics is a journal publication in the field of engineering informatics.
 The Need for a Science of Engineering Informatics. Artificial Intelligence for Engineering Design, Analysis and Manufacturing (AI-EDAM), 2007, 21:1(23–26).
 JCISE Special Issue, March 2008 This special issue has a guest editorial and a few research papers in the Engineering Informatics domain.
 Special Issue on “Engineering Informatics”, by Eswaran Subrahmanian and Sudarsan Rachuri, J. Comput. Inf. Sci. Eng. 8(1), 010301 (Feb 28, 2008).

Research
 Engineering Informatics Group, a research group at Stanford University, USA

References

Engineering disciplines
Information science by discipline
Computational fields of study